Bhakta Dhruva is a 1934 Indian Kannada language Mythological devotional film directed by Parshwanath Altekar and produced by U. L. Narayana Rao. Although this was the very first talkie film to go under production, it released as the second film after Sati Sulochana in the same year. The film was made at the Ajanta Studio in Mumbai and premiered at the "Select Cinema" hall in Bangalore.

Based on the play by Ratnavali Natak Company, the film was made by the Marathi stage and film director, as a tribute to the Karnataka theater personality, A. V. Varadachar, who died in 1933.

The film cast consisted of Master Muthu, grandson of Varadachar, in the titular lead role along with T. Dwarkanath, G. Nagesh, H. S. Krishnamurthy Iyengar among others. The music was composed by Harmonium Sheshadri Rao.

Plot
The film tells a mythological story about the child Dhruva who in utmost devotion towards Lord Vishnu, ultimately finds a place in sky as the brightest star (Dhruva Nakshatra) and finds solace at the place.

Cast
 Master Muthu as Dhruva
 T. Dwarkanath
 H. S. Krishnamurthy Iyengar
 T. Kanakalakshmamma
 S. K. Padma Devi as Bhoo Devi
 G. Nagesh
 Devudu Narasimha Shastry
 M. G. Mari Rao

References

External sources

Bhakta Dhruva on Chiloka.com 

songs.pk

1934 films
1930s Kannada-language films
1930s biographical drama films
Indian biographical drama films
Indian black-and-white films
Indian films based on plays
1934 drama films
Films based on the Bhagavata Purana